Gazhak or Gazahak may refer to:
 Gazhak, Kerman
 Gazhak, Sistan and Baluchestan